Celebrity Sports Showdown is a sports video game for the Wii developed by EA Canada, and was the first title released under the EA Sports Freestyle label. The game features ten sporting and musical celebrities competing against each other in a number of sporting events. Through playing the twelve mini-games, a number of non-celebrity characters can be unlocked as well.

Gameplay

Similar to other sports games collections on the Wii such as Wii Sports, Big Beach Sports and Deca Sports, Celebrity Sports Showdown uses the motion detection of the Wii Remote for control. For example, in the canoeing event players must hold the Wii Remote sideways while performing a rowing motion as with a real set of paddles, while the inner tube and skiing events use quick gestures to perform tricks or jumps as the player tilts the controller to steer.

Players can compete either on their own or in a team of up to four members.

Celebrities

 Fergie
 Avril Lavigne
 LeAnn Rimes
 Keith Urban
 Nelly Furtado

 Paul Pierce
 Mia Hamm
 Kristi Yamaguchi
 Reggie Bush
 Sugar Ray Leonard

Sports

 Beach Volleyball
 Inner-Tubing
 Wild Water Canoeing
 Hurdle Derby
 Slalom Showdown
 Cliff Hangers

 Smash Badminton
 Rapid Fire Archery
 Joust Duel
 Curling
 Arena Dodgeball
 Air Racers

Reception

Celebrity Sports Showdown received mixed reviews from critics. On Metacritic, the game holds a score of 50/100 based on 12 reviews.

Ellie Gibson of Eurogamer gave the game a 6/10, praising it for having "decent" mini-games but criticizing the game's presentation for being "rubbish" in terms of the character design and level art. Matt Casamassina of IGN was less forgiving of the game, giving it 4/10 while criticizing its selection of mini-games, implementation of the Wii's controls, and depiction of the celebrities.

References

2008 video games
Electronic Arts games
Fantasy sports video games
Multiplayer and single-player video games
Cultural depictions of American people
Cultural depictions of Canadian people
Cultural depictions of sportspeople
Cultural depictions of pop musicians
Video games based on real people
Video games developed in Canada
Wii games
Wii-only games